Wahi is a Punjabi Khatri surname. According to Shyam Singh Shashi, they're related to the ancient clan of Bālhikas. They were found in Pindigheb, Rawalpindi in West Punjab.

Notable people 

 Adita Wahi, Indian actress
 Arushee Wahi, Indian swimmer & three-time winner of The Sheikh Hamdan Award
 Jasmine Wahi, Indian-American curator, educator, and activist
 Karan Wahi, Indian actor and host
 Prem Nath Wahi, former director general of the Indian Council of Medical Research (ICMR)
 Rakesh Wahi, Indian military veteran and founder of CNBC Africa and Forbes Africa Magazine
 Satya Pal Wahi, former chairman at ONGC at CCI
 Tarun Kumar Wahi, comic book artist and the chief writer for Raj Comics and creator of the superheros Doga, Parmanu, Bheriya

References 

Surnames